Elorm Ama Ababio (popularly known as Ama Governor) is a Ghanaian YouTuber, social media influencer and lawyer-in-waiting. In November 2022, she was denied the call to the Ghana Bar even though she completed the law program, passed her exams and scaled her interview session.

Education 
Ama completed the Ghana School of Law.

Controversy 
In November 2022, the General Legal Council of Ghana decided to put on hold Ama's call to Ghana's Bar due to a petition that was filed against her by Justice Cynthia Pamela A. Addo who is the Secretary of the Council. It is stated in the petition Ama was seen in videos that were making rounds and were described as "conduct unbecoming of an applicant to be called to the Bar."

Aftermath 
Some Ghanaians on social media started an online petition against the General Legal Council. They protested the suspension of Ama's call to Ghana's Bar and called the petition "Justice for Ama Governor".

Criticism 
Francis-Xavier Sosu criticized the General Legal Council for deciding not to call a 'qualified' law student to the bar due to a bad character and that she has a freedom of speech and expression in her private spaces.

Support 
Ghanamanti Wayo who is a lawyer backed the decision of the General Legal Council claiming some images of Ama in her private life were 'inappropriate' and that Ama could be compromised after she becomes a judge.

Fatimatu Abubakar also claimed people faced similar fates in previous years due to law students' failure to show character expected of them.

Lawyer Moses Foh-Amoaning, also claimed he is in support of the decision of the General Legal Council.

Haruna Amaliba, a member of the National Democratic Congress also claimed to support the decision of the General Legal Council.

References 

Living people
Ghanaian YouTubers
YouTube vloggers
Ghanaian lawyers
Year of birth missing (living people)